Nemapogon nevellus is a moth of the family Tineidae. It is found in north-western Russia.

References

Moths described in 1963
Nemapogoninae